Leontopodium kamtschaticum is a species of plant in the family Asteraceae. It is native to the Kamchatka Peninsula, Russia.

References

kamtschaticum
Plants described in 1930